Rosemary Smith (born 7 August 1937) is a rally driver from Dublin, Ireland. She initially trained as a dress designer.

Biography
Smith entered her first rally as a co-driver. After deciding that navigating was not to her liking, she switched to driving. She came to the attention of the Rootes Group's Competition Department, which offered her a works drive.

In 1964, she took the ladies' prize on the Circuit of Ireland Rally driving a Sunbeam Rapier. The following year she won the Tulip Rally outright in a Hillman Imp.

Smith was controversially disqualified from the 1966 Monte Carlo Rally after winning the Coupe des Dames, the ladies' class. Ten cars in total were disqualified. "Rosemary Smith said she would never compete again unless the decision was reversed."

Her other competition successes included an outright win in the 1969 Cork 20 Rally. Smith has won the ladies' prize several times on the Scottish Rally and on the Circuit of Ireland Rally, twice each on the Alpine Rally and on the Canadian Shell 4000 and once on the Acropolis Rally. She also has numerous class wins to her name.

In 1966, Smith appeared as a guest on an episode of What's My Line. Arlene Francis, Mark Goodson, Ginger Rogers, and Bennett Cerf were on the panel and successfully guessed her "line" as a rally driver.

Smith founded a driving school in the 1990s. On 10 May 2017, she did a test drive with the show car of Renault F1 on the Circuit Paul Ricard as part of a filming day. This made her the oldest person to have driven an 800bhp racing car.

References

Further reading
 Mowat-Brown, G. (2003). Imp: The Complete Story. The Crowood Press.
 Smith, Rosemary (2018). Driven. Harper Collins.

External links 

 The Imp Site
 Rosemary Smith bio from Shell 4000 Rally
 Rosemary Smith driving the Renault Sport Formula One

Living people
Irish rally drivers
Female rally drivers
1937 births
Irish co-drivers
Irish female racing drivers